The Prix Michel-Sarrazin is awarded annually in the Canadian province of Quebec by the Club de Recherches Clinique du Québec to a celebrated Québécois scientist who, by their dynamism and productivity, have contributed in an important way to the advancement of research biomedical. It is named in honour of Michel Sarrazin (1659–1734) who was the first Canadian scientist.

Winners
Source: CRCQ

1977 – Michel Chrétien
1978 – Jean-Marie Delage
1979 – Guy Lemieux
1980 – Charles Philippe Leblond
1981 – René Simard
1982 – Louis Poirier
1983 – André Barbeau
1984 – Jacques R. Ducharme
1985 – André Lanthier
1986 – Claude Fortier
1987 – Domenico Regoli
1988 – Charles Scriver
1989 – Serge Carrière
1990 – Fernand Labrie
1991 – Étienne LeBel
1992 – Réginald Nadeau
1993 – Claude C. Roy
1994 – Jacques Leblanc
1995 – Clarke Fraser
1996 – Jacques Genest
1997 – Samuel Solomon
1998 – Jacques de Champlain
1999 – Claude Laberge
2000 – Martial G. Bourassa
2001 – Jean Davignon
2002 – Brenda Milner
2003 – Peter T. Macklem
2004 – Francis Glorieux
2005 – Pavel Hamet
2006 – Marek Rola-Pleszczynski
2007 – Rémi Quirion
2008 – Serge Rossignol
2009 – Jacques P. Tremblay
2010 – Michel Bouvier
2011 – Stanley Nattel
2012 – Michel L. Tremblay
2013 – Vassilios Papadopoulos
2014 – Roger Lecomte
2015 – Claude Perreault
2016 – Michel G. Bergeron
2017 – Anne-Marie Mes-Masson
2018 – William D. Fraser

See also

 List of biochemistry awards
 List of biomedical science awards
 List of awards named after people

References
 Prix Michel-Sarrazin 

Canadian science and technology awards
Awards established in 1977
Biochemistry awards
Biomedical awards